Robin Christopher Jennings (born April 11, 1972) is a Singaporean-born American former professional baseball outfielder. He is the only person born in Singapore to play in Major League Baseball (MLB), appearing in games for the Chicago Cubs, Oakland Athletics, Colorado Rockies, and Cincinnati Reds.

Drafted by the Cubs in the 33rd round of the 1991 Major League Baseball draft, Jennings made his Major League Baseball debut on April 18, 1996, and appeared in his final game on October 7, 2001. He played in a total of 93 games, batting .244 in 213 at-bats, with three home runs and 24 runs batted in (RBI).

He was traded twice in July 2001. The Oakland Athletics sent him to the Colorado Rockies for Ron Gant on July 3. He played in only one game for the Rockies, and was traded to the Cincinnati Reds on July 19.

External links

1972 births
Living people
Chicago Cubs players
Oakland Athletics players
Colorado Rockies players
Cincinnati Reds players
Major League Baseball outfielders
Major League Baseball right fielders
Major League Baseball players from Singapore
Geneva Cubs players
Peoria Chiefs players
Daytona Cubs players
Orlando Rays players
Iowa Cubs players
West Tennessee Diamond Jaxx players
Salt Lake Buzz players
SCF Manatees baseball players
Louisville RiverBats players
Sacramento River Cats players
Colorado Springs Sky Sox players
Louisville Bats players
Chattanooga Lookouts players
Harrisburg Senators players
Columbus Clippers players

State College of Florida, Manatee–Sarasota alumni